Bình Triệu station is a subsidiary station of Saigon station. A high speed line is scheduled for completion to take traffic congestion away from Saigon.

See also
 Phan Thiết station

References

Railway stations in Vietnam